The Okanese First Nation (okinîs, literal meaning: Little Rose-hip) is a Cree-Saulteaux First Nation band government in Balcarres, Saskatchewan, Canada.

The Okanese First Nation was a signatory to Treaty number four. It is named after a leader named Okanis, who signed the treaty on their behalf, on September 9, 1875. The Nation's population was 104 in 1879. 225 of the 459 members lived on the Nation's Reserve in 1999.

In June 2008 Canwest reported Marie-Anne Day Walker-Pelletier the Chief of the Okanese since 1981, was the longest-serving female Chief in Saskatchewan.

Notable births
 Dawn Dumont, writer
 Connie Walker (1979), journalist

References

First Nations in Saskatchewan